The 1990 Batticaloa massacre, also known as  the Sathurukondan massacre, was a massacre of at least 184  minority Sri Lankan Tamil refugees, including infants, from three villages in the Batticaloa District by the Sri Lankan Army on September 9, 1990. Although the government instituted two investigations, no one was ever charged.

Background information

During the British colonial period, approximately 60% of the civil service jobs were held by the minority Sri Lankan Tamils, who constituted approximately 15% of the population prior to 1948. This was partly due to the availability of Western-style education provided by the Protestant American Ceylon Mission, Hindu revivalists, and local Catholic missions in the Tamil-dominated Jaffna peninsula. After gaining independence from Britain in 1948, Sinhalese politicians made the over-representation a political issue. They initiated measures aimed at correcting the over-representation by establishing ethnic quotas for university entrants.  These measures, and a series of riots and pogroms starting from 1958 that targeted Sri Lankan Tamils and the resultant mass murder, displacements and refugees, led to the formation of rebel groups advocating independence for Sri Lankan Tamils. After the 1983 Black July pogrom, full-scale civil war erupted between the government and the rebel groups. During the course of the civil war there were a number of massacres of civilians, war rapes, torture and enforced disappearances attributed to both the government and allied groups as well as the various rebel formations.

The massacre
The village of Sathurukondan lies just beyond Iruthayapuram, the northern suburb of Batticaloa. At 5:30 p.m. on September 9, 1990, armed men in uniform and in civilian clothes came into the area and ordered everyone to come on to the road. They were then marched to the army camp in the vicinity after being told that they would be questioned and released. Most of those who were left in the village that day were elderly, women and the very young.

According to the only survivor, Kanthasamy Krishnakumar (21), in a recording made before leading citizens in Batticaloa: 

Krishnakumar who was injured, managed to roll out of sight in the semi-darkness, crept away to a house and asked for water. He then went to his village and stayed in an empty house, and later found his way to his cousin's in Batticaloa town.

The list of victims totaled 184 (38 Sathurukondan, 47 Kokuvil, 37 Panniachchiady and 62 Pillayarady). Of this number, there were 47 children below the age of 10 and several women.

Government investigation
Retired judge K. Palakidnar of the Special Presidential Commission of inquiry appointed by the People's Alliance government described the massacre in detail in his final report. According to the report of the commission of inquiry, 5 infants, 42 children under ten, 85 women and 28 old persons were among the 184 villagers who were murdered. The judge also identified three captains of the Sri Lankan Army: Warnakulasooriya, Herath and Wijenaike as the responsible parties. The judge in his report urged the Sri Lankan President that there is strong evidence for the massacre and that legal action should be taken against the perpetrators. Although indictment levelled against alleged miscreants by the Human Rights Task Force, no action has been taken against the alleged perpetrators. Within the Batticaloa district, during the late 1980s and early 1990s a total of 1,100 civilians disappeared, assumed killed.

References

Massacres in 1990
September 1990 events in Asia
September 1990 crimes
Attacks on civilians attributed to the Sri Lanka Army
Massacres in Sri Lanka
Mass murder of Sri Lankan Tamils
Sri Lankan government forces attacks in Eelam War II
Terrorist incidents in Sri Lanka in 1990
1990 murders in Sri Lanka